The Eisenhower Doctrine was a policy enunciated by Dwight D. Eisenhower on January 5, 1957, within a "Special Message to the Congress on the Situation in the Middle East". Under the Eisenhower Doctrine, a Middle Eastern country could request American economic assistance or aid from U.S. military forces if it was being threatened by armed aggression. Eisenhower singled out the Soviet threat in his doctrine by authorizing the commitment of U.S. forces "to secure and protect the territorial integrity and political independence of such nations, requesting such aid against overt armed aggression from any nation controlled by international communism." The phrase "international communism" made the doctrine much broader than simply responding to Soviet military action. A danger that could be linked to communists of any nation could conceivably invoke the doctrine.

Most Arabs regarded the doctrine as a transparent ploy to promote Western influence in the Middle East by restraining Nasser's brand of Arab nationalism that opposed Western domination, and some like the Syrians publicly denounced the initiative as an insidious example of U.S. imperialism. Following the 1958 crisis in Lebanon and accusations by U.S. senators of exaggerating the threat of communism to the region, Eisenhower privately admitted that the real goal was combating Arab nationalism.

Background

In the global political context, the doctrine was made in response to the possibility of a generalized war, threatened due to the Soviet Union's latent threat becoming involved in Egypt after the Suez Crisis. Coupled with the power vacuum left by the decline of British and French power in the region after the U.S. protested against the conduct of their allies during the Suez War, Eisenhower thought that the strong position needed to better the situation was further complicated by the positions taken by Egypt's Gamal Abdel Nasser, who was rapidly building a power base and using it to play the Soviets and Americans against each other, taking a position of "positive neutrality" and accepting aid from the Soviets.

On the regional level, the doctrine's intent was to provide the independent Arab regimes with an alternative to Nasser's political control, strengthening them while isolating communist influence through Nasser's isolation. It largely failed on that front, with Nasser's power quickly rising by 1959 to when he could shape the leadership outcomes in neighboring Arab countries such as Iraq and Saudi Arabia; in the meantime, his relationship with the Soviet leaders deteriorated, allowing the U.S. to switch to a policy of accommodation.

The administration also saw the Middle East as being critical for future foreign policy regarding the United States and its allies. The region contains a large percentage of the world's oil reserves needed by the allies. Eisenhower's protests against longtime allies—Britain and France—during the Suez Crisis lead to the collapse of British and French influence in the Middle East, spawning fears of Soviet domination made more credible by Nasser's increasingly pro-Soviet disposition. The Eisenhower Doctrine was a backflip against the previous policy; the U.S. now had the burden of military action in the Middle East to itself.

The doctrine was not successfully applied in that year's crisis in Syria but was instead invoked in the Lebanon crisis the following year, when the U.S. intervened in response to a request by that country's then President Camille Chamoun.

See also
 United States foreign policy in the Middle East
 Foreign policy of the Dwight D. Eisenhower administration
 Syrian Crisis of 1957

References

Further reading
 Brands, H.W. Into the Labyrinth: The United States and the Middle East, 1945–1993 (1994) excerpt pp. 69–72.
 Hahn, Peter L. "Securing the Middle East: The Eisenhower Doctrine of 1957." Presidential Studies Quarterly 36.1 (2006): 38–47. online

  Lesch, David W.  "The 1957 American–Syrian Crisis: Globalist Policy in a Regional Reality", in The Middle East and the United States: History, Politics, and Ideologies; David W. Lesch and Mark L Hass eds., Westview Press, 2013 edition, pp. 111–127.
 Meiertöns, Heiko (2010): The Doctrines of US Security Policy – An Evaluation under International Law, Cambridge University Press, .
 Takeyh, Ray. The Origins of the Eisenhower Doctrine: The US, Britain and Nasser's Egypt, 1953–57 (2000) 
 Yaqub, Salim. Containing Arab nationalism: the Eisenhower doctrine and the Middle East (University of North Carolina Press, 2004).

External links
 Text of the January 5, 1957 Special Message to Congress

Soviet Union–United States relations
Middle East
1957 in the United States
1957 in international relations
Foreign policy doctrines of the United States
Anti-communism in the Middle East
Opposition to Arab nationalism